Bebek Mosque, officially Hümayûn-u Âbad Mosque ( for: Prosperous Imperial Mosque) is a 1913-built mosque located in Bebek neighborhood of Beşiktaş district in Istanbul, Turkey.

Bebek Mosque was designed by Mimar Kemaleddin (1870–1927) in the architectural style of First national architectural movement, and built in Bebek on the place of a mosque, which was commissioned by Grand Vizier Nevşehirli Damat Ibrahim Pasha (1666–1730).

It is situated inside a courtyard surrounded by low concrete walls on Cevdet Paşa Cad. behind the Bebek Pier in Bebek Bay on Bosphorus. The mosque has a square plan, and is built in limestone ashlar. The main dome is supported by four half domes sitting on eight frames. It has six arched windows, two each in the front and back, and one each at sides, and 28 small arched windows in total above them. The mosque has a polygonal minaret on a high base adjacent to the western wall. The underside of the minaret balcony is decorated with three lines of muqarnas. Minaret's entrance is next to the narthex outside the mosque.

References

Ottoman mosques in Istanbul
Buildings and structures in Istanbul
Mosques completed in 1913
Beşiktaş
Bosphorus
1913 establishments in the Ottoman Empire
Mimar Kemaleddin buildings
20th-century religious buildings and structures in Turkey